The 2018 CFL Draft took place on May 3, 2018, at 8:00 pm ET and was broadcast on TSN and RDS. Sixty-nine players were chosen from among eligible players from Canadian Universities across the country, as well as Canadian players playing in the NCAA.

The draft was broadcast live on TSN for two hours and then subsequent coverage shifted to digital platforms on TSN.ca and TSN GO. The production was hosted by Farhan Lalji and featured the CFL on TSN panel which includes Duane Forde, Dave Naylor, Davis Sanchez, and Justin Dunk. Randy Ambrosie, the CFL commissioner, was at the TSN studios to announce the picks for the first two rounds.

Top prospects

Trades
In the explanations below, (D) denotes trades that took place during the draft, while (PD) indicates trades completed pre-draft.

Round one
 Montreal ←→ Hamilton (PD)  Montreal traded the first, 31st, and 44th overall selections in this year's draft and a second-round pick in the 2019 CFL Draft to Hamilton in exchange for the second, 34th, and 56th overall picks in this year's draft, Ryan Bomben, and Jamal Robinson. 
 Edmonton → Hamilton (PD). Edmonton traded the sixth and 37th overall selections in this year's draft to Hamilton for the 10th and 20th overall selections in this year's draft.
 Winnipeg → BC (PD). Winnipeg traded seventh and 16th overall selections in this year's draft to BC for the 12th overall selection in this year's draft and BC's original first-round pick in the 2019 CFL Draft.

Round two
 Edmonton → Hamilton (PD). Edmonton traded this selection to Hamilton for John Chick and a fifth-round pick in this year's draft.
 Montreal → Saskatchewan (PD)  Montreal traded a second-round conditional selection and a fourth-round selection in the 2017 CFL Draft to Saskatchewan for Darian Durant. This condition was fulfilled. 
 Saskatchewan → Hamilton (PD). Saskatchewan traded the 10th overall selection to Hamilton for Zach Collaros.
 Hamilton → Edmonton (PD). Hamilton traded the 10th and 20th overall selections in this year's draft to Hamilton for the sixth and 37th overall selections in this year's draft.
 Winnipeg ←→ BC (PD). Winnipeg traded seventh and 16th overall selections in this year's draft to BC for the 12th overall selection in this year's draft and BC's original first-round pick in the 2019 CFL Draft.

Round three
 Toronto → Winnipeg (PD). Toronto traded this selection, T. J. Heath, and a first-round pick in the 2017 CFL Draft to Winnipeg for Drew Willy.
 Saskatchewan → Montreal (PD). Saskatchewan traded this selection, Tevaughn Campbell, and a third-round pick in the 2019 CFL Draft to Montreal for Vernon Adams and a fifth-round pick in this year's draft.
 Edmonton → Toronto (PD). Edmonton traded this selection and James Franklin to Toronto for Mason Woods.
 Hamilton → Edmonton (PD). Hamilton traded the 10th and 20th overall selections in this year's draft to Hamilton for the sixth and 37th overall selections in this year's draft.

Round four
 Saskatchewan → Montreal (PD). Saskatchewan traded this selection to Montreal for Andrew Lue.
 Calgary → Hamilton (PD). Calgary traded this selection and Charleston Hughes to Hamilton for the 28th overall pick (fourth round) in this year's draft and a fourth-round pick in the 2019 CFL Draft.
 Hamilton → Calgary (PD). Hamilton traded this selection and fourth-round pick in the 2019 CFL Draft to Calgary for Charleston Hughes and the 34th overall pick (fourth round) in this year's draft.
 BC → Ottawa (PD). BC traded this selection and a negotiation list player to Ottawa for Odell Willis. 
 Montreal ←→ Hamilton (PD)  Montreal traded the first, 31st, and 44th overall selections in this year's draft and a second-round pick in the 2019 CFL Draft to Hamilton in exchange for the second, 34th, and 56th overall picks in this year's draft, Ryan Bomben, and Jamal Robinson. 
 Montreal → BC (D)  Montreal traded the 34th overall selection in this year's draft to BC in exchange for the 38th and 46th overall picks in this year's draft.

Round five
 Ottawa → Calgary (PD). Ottawa traded this selection to Calgary for Drew Tate.
 Montreal → Saskatchewan (PD). Montreal traded this selection and Vernon Adams to Saskatchewan for Tevaughn Campbell, a third-round pick in this year's draft, and a third-round pick in the 2019 CFL Draft.
 Hamilton → Edmonton (PD). Hamilton traded this selection and John Chick to Edmonton for a second-round pick in this year's draft.
 Edmonton → Hamilton (PD). Edmonton traded the sixth and 37th overall selections in this year's draft to Hamilton for the 10th and 20th overall selections in this year's draft.
 BC → Montreal (D)  BC traded the 38th and 46th overall selections in this year's draft to Montreal in exchange for the 34th overall pick in this year's draft.

Round six
 Hamilton → Saskatchewan (PD). Hamilton traded this selection and Mike McAdoo to Saskatchewan for Ricky Collins and a seventh-round pick in this year's draft.
 Saskatchewan → BC (PD). Saskatchewan traded a conditional selection to BC for Mike Edem and a conditional selection in this year's draft. Edem's performance fulfilled a condition and BC was awarded a selection.
 Toronto → Montreal (PD). Toronto traded this conditional selection and a sixth-round selection in the 2017 CFL Draft to Montreal for S. J. Green. Green's performance fulfilled the condition and Montreal was given this sixth-round pick.
 Montreal → Hamilton (PD)  Montreal traded the first, 31st, and 44th overall selections in this year's draft and a second-round pick in the 2019 CFL Draft to Hamilton in exchange for the second, 34th, and 56th overall picks in this year's draft, Ryan Bomben, and Jamal Robinson. 
 BC → Montreal (D)  BC traded the 38th and 46th overall selections in this year's draft to Montreal in exchange for the 34th overall pick in this year's draft.

Round seven
 Saskatchewan → Hamilton (PD). Saskatchewan traded this selection and Ricky Collins to Hamilton for Mike McAdoo and a sixth-round pick in this year's draft.
 Hamilton → Edmonton (PD). Hamilton traded this selection and a fifth-round pick in the 2019 CFL Draft to Edmonton for Shamawd Chambers.
 Hamilton → Montreal (PD)  Hamilton traded the second, 34th, and 56th overall picks in this year's draft, Ryan Bomben, and Jamal Robinson to Montreal in exchange for the first, 31st, and 44th overall selections in this year's draft and a second-round pick in the 2019 CFL Draft.

Round eight
 Saskatchewan → Edmonton (PD). Saskatchewan traded this selection and a negotiation list player to Edmonton for Cedric McKinley and a negotiation list player.
 BC → Saskatchewan (PD). BC traded a conditional selection and Mike Edem to Saskatchewan for a conditional selection in this year's draft. BC was given Saskatchewan's sixth-round pick and Saskatchewan received BC's eighth.
 Edmonton→ Hamilton (PD). Edmonton traded an eighth-round conditional selection to Hamilton for Alex Hoffman-Ellis. Hoffman-Ellis' performance fulfilled the condition and Hamilton was awarded this pick.

Conditional trades
 Saskatchewan → Toronto (PD). Saskatchewan traded a conditional selection and Shawn Lemon to Toronto for Matt Sewell and Mitchell Gale.
 Saskatchewan → Winnipeg (PD). Saskatchewan traded a conditional selection to Winnipeg for Brett Blaszko.

Forfeitures
 Winnipeg forfeits their third-round selection after selecting Drew Wolitarsky in the 2017 Supplemental Draft.
 Saskatchewan forfeits their fifth-round selection after selecting Brandyn Bartlett in the 2017 Supplemental Draft.
 Ottawa forfeits their sixth-round selection after selecting Austin Reuland in the 2017 Supplemental Draft.

Draft order

Round one

Round two

Round three

Round four

Round five

Round six

Round seven

Round eight

References

Canadian College Draft
2018 in Canadian football